Tokyo Collection is the first live album by the Japanese band Tokyo Jihen, released on February 15, 2012 by EMI Music Japan / Virgin Music. It also served as the band's only greatest hits album. The first press edition is a cardboard sleeve.

Track listing

Notes and references

External links
 Oricon Profile Tokyo Jihen CD

Tokyo Jihen albums
2012 live albums